The 1984–85 Northern Football League season was the 87th in the history of Northern Football League, a football competition in England.

Division One

Division One featured 16 clubs which competed in the division last season, along with two new clubs, promoted from Division Two:
 Chester-le-Street Town
 Ryhope Community

League table

Division Two

Division Two featured 16 clubs which competed in the division last season, along with two new clubs, relegated from Division One:
 Ashington
 Evenwood Town

League table

References

External links
 Northern Football League official site

Northern Football League seasons
1984–85 in English football leagues